Auntwan Demone Riggins (born June 17, 1976) is an American college baseball coach, currently serving as head coach of the Prairie View A&M Panthers baseball team.

Head coaching record

See also
 List of current NCAA Division I baseball coaches

References

External links

Living people
Texas Southern Tigers baseball players
High school baseball coaches in the United States
Prairie View A&M Panthers baseball coaches
Medicine Hat Blue Jays players
Hagerstown Suns players
Fort Wayne Wizards players
Lake Elsinore Storm players
Portland Beavers players
Evansville Otters players
Coastal Bend Aviators players
1976 births
African-American baseball coaches
American expatriate baseball players in Canada
Mobile BayBears players
St. Catharines Stompers players
Baseball coaches from Texas
Baseball players from Houston